Chute-Saint-Philippe is a municipality in the Laurentides region of Quebec, Canada, part of the Antoine-Labelle Regional County Municipality.

The village is located in a fairly flat valley surrounded by a mountainous area of the Laurentian Hills that are dominated by mixed forest.

History
The settlement initially had the name Chute-Leon at the beginning of the 20th century, in memory of Pope Leo XIII (1810-1903), and was called Victoria Falls by 1903, in honour of Queen Victoria (1819-1901).

In 1921, a mission was founded here with Philip the Apostle as its patron saint. In 1934, the local post office was renamed to Chute-Saint-Philippe, taking its name from a drop on the Kiamika River and the patron saint. On December 26, 1940, the Municipality of Chute St-Philippe was formed out of territory ceded from Ferme-Neuve and an adjacent unorganized territory. In 1969, the orthography was adjusted to Chute-Saint-Philippe.

In 1966, the mission received its status as a parish.

Demographics 

Mother tongue:
 English as first language: 1.9%
 French as first language: 95.2%
 English and French as first language: 1.4%
 Other as first language: 1.4%

Local government

Chute-Saint-Philippe forms part of the federal electoral district of Laurentides—Labelle and has been represented by Marie-Hélène Gaudreau of the Bloc Québécois since 2019. Provincially, Chute-Saint-Philippe is part of the Labelle electoral district and is represented by Chantale Jeannotte of the Coalition Avenir Québec since 2018.

List of former mayors:
 Heni Jolicoeur (1941–1967)
 Arnold Michaudville (1967–1971)
 Jean-Pierre Jolicoeur (1971–1973)
 Georges Bélec (1973–1975)
 Fernand Prud'Homme (1975–1978)
 Jacques Perras (1978–1981)
 Francine Bélec (interim 1981)
 Jean-Pierre Jolicoeur (1981–1995)
 Henriette Lachaine (1995–1997)
 Jean-Jacques Paquette (1997–2005)
 Claude Blain (2005–2009)
 Normand St-Amour (2009–present)

See also
List of municipalities in Quebec

References

External links
 

Incorporated places in Laurentides
Municipalities in Quebec